Tai No is a village in Sai Kung District, Hong Kong.

Administration
Tai No is a recognized village under the New Territories Small House Policy.

See also
 Tai No Sheung Yeung

References

External links

 Delineation of area of existing village Tai No (Sai Kung) for election of resident representative (2019 to 2022) (includes Tai No Sheung Yeung)

Villages in Sai Kung District, Hong Kong